"Codeine Dreaming" is a song by the American rapper Kodak Black featuring fellow American rapper Lil Wayne. Released as a single on November 24, 2017, it appears on the deluxe version of the former's fifth mixtape Project Baby 2 (2017) and his seventh mixtape Heart Break Kodak (2018).

Background and composition 
Originally, Kodak Black wanted to recruit fellow American rapper Future on the track, as revealed on an Instagram live session.

The song revolves around Kodak and Lil Wayne getting high from codeine and other drugs. It jokes about dreaming and uses metaphors with space and planets. Black rhymes about Uranus, Saturn, Mercury and Neptune and likens himself to the character Jimmy Neutron. Wayne mentions going to Mars at one point.

Charts

Weekly charts

Year-end charts

Certifications

References 

2017 singles
2017 songs
Kodak Black songs
Lil Wayne songs
Atlantic Records singles
Songs written by Kodak Black
Songs written by Lil Wayne
Songs written by Ben Billions
Songs written by Infamous (producer)